The 1910 Govan by-election was a parliamentary by-election held for the House of Commons constituency of the Govan Division of Lanarkshire on 28 April 1910.

Vacancy
The by-election was caused by the appointment of the sitting Liberal Member of Parliament (MP), William Hunter KC as Solicitor General for Scotland. Under the Parliamentary rules applicable at the time if Hunter wished to remain an MP he had to resign and fight a by-election.

Candidates
The Govan Liberals re-selected Hunter to try to retain his seat which he had held since the January 1910 general election when he obtained a majority of 1,429 votes and gained the seat from the Unionists.

It was reported that the Unionists were not eager to contest a by-election and that "as a matter of courtesy" Hunter might be allowed a walkover.  An added consideration was that it seemed likely a new general election would be called within a few months. Representatives of the Conservatives and Liberal Unionists met on 21 April to discuss the by-election and decided not to put up a candidate.

Despite having contested the constituency at the previous general election, the Labour Party also chose not to oppose Hunter.

The result
There being no other candidates putting themselves forward, Hunter was returned unopposed.

See also
1889 Govan by-election
1973 Glasgow Govan by-election
1988 Glasgow Govan by-election
Lists of United Kingdom by-elections 
United Kingdom by-election records

References

1910 in Scotland
1910s elections in Scotland
1910 elections in the United Kingdom
By-elections to the Parliament of the United Kingdom in Glasgow constituencies
Unopposed ministerial by-elections to the Parliament of the United Kingdom in Scottish constituencies
1910s in Glasgow
Govan
April 1910 events